José Luis Grasset (28 May 1901 – 19 October 1974) was a Spanish middle-distance runner. He competed in the men's 800 metres at the 1920 Summer Olympics.

References

1901 births
1974 deaths
Athletes (track and field) at the 1920 Summer Olympics
Spanish male middle-distance runners
Olympic athletes of Spain
Place of birth missing
20th-century Spanish people